Eulophonotus hyalinipennis is a moth in the family Cossidae. It is found in South Africa, Eswatini, Mozambique, Tanzania and Zimbabwe.

References

Natural History Museum Lepidoptera generic names catalog

Zeuzerinae